The Bold is a left tributary of the river Buzău in Romania. It discharges into the Buzău in Racovița. It flows through Lake Balta Albă.

References

Rivers of Romania
Rivers of Buzău County
Rivers of Brăila County